Nigel David Forster Grindley FRS (born 24 November 1945) is a British biochemist and Professor of Molecular Biophysics and Biochemistry at Yale University.

He studied at the University of Cambridge (BA, 1967) and London University (Ph.D, 1974). He taught at University of Pittsburgh.

He was a 1987 Guggenheim Fellow, and won a 1991 MERIT award from the National Institutes of Health.

He was elected a Fellow of the Royal Society in 2006. He was named as a Fellow of the American Association for the Advancement of Science in 2008.

At Yale his team are studying the effects of a variety of enzymes on DNA.

References

1945 births
Living people
Alumni of Gonville and Caius College, Cambridge
Alumni of the University of London
British biochemists
Fellows of the American Academy of Arts and Sciences
Fellows of the Royal Society
Yale University faculty
University of Pittsburgh faculty